The Proterra Catalyst is a battery electric bus that was built by Proterra from 2014 to 2020.

History 
In 2014 Proterra introduced the Catalyst, a fast-charge 100% electric bus to replace the EcoRide BE35. The bus was built on the EcoRide's design and engineering and delivered a longer, lighter and more fuel-efficient bus. The bus is built from lightweight, durable carbon composite. The overall lower weight helps reduce wear and tear on streets. It has no tailpipe and runs virtually silent.

Specifications 
With the on-route fast charging system, the Catalyst can be operated continuously, 24/7, without the need to head to the depot for lengthy charge times. Catalyst buses equipped with the Fast Charge (FC) battery pack can charge at a rate of up to 500 kW. The company added a  model of the Catalyst to its product line in October 2015.

Catalyst is a modular system, offered with two different lengths, two different drivetrains, and seven different batteries, depending on the required passenger capacity, speed (hill performance), and range, respectively.

Drivetrains 
At introduction, the Catalyst was equipped with a single electric traction motor, the UQM Technologies HD220.

The DuoPower drivetrain was introduced in October 2017; it uses two electric traction motors and has a claimed 20% increase in efficiency compared to the original single-motor drivetrain, which was redesignated ProDrive. As ProDrive, the Catalyst was equipped with an upgraded UQM HD250 motor, which offered increased ratings of  peak power ( continuous) and  peak torque ( continuous). The DuoPower traction motors are permanent magnet alternating current motors manufactured by Parker Hannifin as part of their Global Vehicle Motor (GVM) series.

Batteries 
Buses equipped with the FC (Fast Charge) family of batteries are intended for circulator routes; XR (eXtended Range) battery buses are intended for intermediate-mileage routes; and E2 (Efficient Energy) battery buses are intended for high-mileage routes. The buses were initially offered with lithium-titanate battery chemistry, which Proterra redesignated the TerraVolt FC. FC batteries can be fully recharged in less than ten minutes.

The TerraVolt XR lithium nickel manganese cobalt oxide batteries were introduced in 2015 with improved range but slower charging, approximately one hour to full charge.

TerraVolt E2 batteries were introduced in 2016 with the longest range and slowest charging. The E2 battery range features a 3–5 hour charge time. E2 batteries have an energy density of 160 W-hr/kg and 260 W-hr/L, and use cells from LG Chem.

Batteries are carried under the Catalyst chassis, and use an interchangeable mounting system, so each Catalyst can hold between four and ten battery packs. The batteries can be swapped out, upgraded, or reconfigured as needs change.

Charging 

Buses can charge en route, allowing more trips and higher productivity for circulator or loop routes. One common example is to have charging stations at major transit centers. Two examples of this are the Washington Plaza Bus Terminal in New York and the Mill Woods Transit Center in Edmonton.

Charging rates range from 60 to 120 kW (using the SAE J1772 CCS ports) and from 166 to 350 kW (using a J3105 overhead fast-charger). In 2018, Proterra began offering the OppCharge (SAE J3105-1) overhead charger instead of its proprietary "blade" overhead charger.

Replacement 

On September 15, 2020, Proterra announced the replacement to the Catalyst, the ZX5. The ZX5 40' replaced the BE40 and the ZX5 35' replaced the BE35. Edmonton Transit Service was the launch customer, ordering 40 ZX5 40' buses.

Notable operators

Gallery

Competition 
 New Flyer XE35 Xcelsior CHARGE
 New Flyer XE40 Xcelsior CHARGE
 BYD K9M
 Nova Bus LFSe and LFSe+

External links

Test reports

References

Buses of the United States
Buses of Canada
Battery electric buses
Vehicles introduced in 2014
Low-floor buses
Single-deck buses
Proterra vehicles